The Philippines national cerebral palsy football team is the representative side which represents the Philippines in international cerebral palsy football competitions.

History
The first Philippine national cerebral palsy (CP) football team was organized in 2019, by the non-profit organization Henry V. Moran Foundation with CP Football Philippines, the foundation's "special football arm". The foundation was tasked to organize the national team by the Paralympic Committee of the Philippines which was supposed to represent the Philippines at the 2020 ASEAN Para Games. By July 2019, some players for the national team were already scouted and is already training after the CP Football Philippines conducted numerous try-outs and clinics in 12 cities across the country. The national team nicknamed "CP Rascals" has received sponsorship and support from various private firms such as Globe Telecom and Allianz PNB Life. However the games were later cancelled due to the COVID-19 pandemic.

The Philippines also intends to participate at the 2021 ASEAN Para Games in Vietnam and make their CP football debut at the 2022 Asian Para Games.

References

Football in the Philippines
National cerebral palsy football teams
C